Aron Grünhut (1895–1974) was a Bratislava-based Jewish activist who helped 1,365 Slovak, Czech, Hungarian, and Austrian Jews illegally emigrate to Palestine before and during World War II. Grünhut later received an unauthorized Salvedorean visa from George Mandel-Mantello for himself and his family.

References

1895 births
1974 deaths
Immigrant rights activists
Slovak Jews